"La Belle Châteauneuf" (fl. 16th C.) was the name popularly given to Renée de Rieux, daughter of Jean de Rieux, seigneur de Châteauneuf, who was descended from one of the greatest families of Brittany. The dates of her birth and death are unknown.

She was maid of honour to France's queen mother, Catherine de' Medici, and a member of her notorious "Flying Squadron" (L'escadron volant). She inspired an ardent passion in the duke of Anjou, brother of Charles IX. This intrigue deterred the duke from agreeing to an arranged marriage with Elizabeth I of England; but he soon abandoned la Châteauneuf for Marie of Cleves (1571). The court then wished to find a husband for her, whose singular beauty gave her an influence which the queen-mother feared, and matches were in turn suggested with the Voivode of Transylvania, the Earl of Leicester; with Antoine Duprat, provost of Paris; and with the Count of Brienne, all of which came to nothing.

Ultimately, Renée was banished from the court on the ground that she had been lacking in respect toward the queen, Louise of Lorraine. She married a Florentine named Antinotti, whom she stabbed in a fit of jealousy (1577). She remarried, her husband being Philip Altoviti, who in 1586 was killed in a duel by the Grand Prior Henri d'Angoulême, who was himself mortally wounded.

References

Sources

 Daniel Christiaens, Vladimir Chichkine, Une figure de l’escadron volant : Renée de Rieux, la baronne de Castellane, dans Proslogion, vol. 5 (1), 2019, p. 144-156, DOI: 10.24411/2500-0926-2019-00009

French nobility
French people of Breton descent
French maids of honour
Mistresses of French royalty
16th-century French people
French ladies-in-waiting